Kärbholz are a German indie-punk band from Ruppichteroth, formed in 2003. The group has released seven albums.

Band member

Discography

Albums 
 2006: Heimvorteil (-), Split-EP
 2007: Spiel des Lebens (Asphalt Records), Debut album
 2008: Zurück nach vorn (Asphalt Records)
 2008: Vollgas Rock'n'Roll (Asphalt Records); EP, reedition of „Heimvorteil“ EP
 2009: Mit Leib und Seele (Asphalt Records)
 2011: 100% (Asphalt Records)
 2013: Rastlos (Better Than Hell)
 2015: Karma (Metalville)
 2015: Karma - Live (Metalville)
 2017: Überdosis Leben
 2017: Spiel des Lebens - Alles neu (Metalville); reedition of "Spiel des Lebens"

Singles 
 2010: Du bist König (Asphalt Records)
 2012: Fallen & Fliegen (Better Than Hell)

References

German musical groups